Penn State DuBois is a commonwealth campus of the Pennsylvania State University and it is located in DuBois, Pennsylvania.

History
Founded as the DuBois Center of the Pennsylvania State College in 1935, the first classes were held in the Hubert Street School by four full-time and one part-time faculty. In 1937, the DuBois School Board and the family of city founder John E. DuBois endowed the center with a four-acre campus including the original DuBois family mansion and stables. Extensive renovations were carried out on the Tudor-style mansion and grounds by the Works Progress Administration, and classes began in "The Mansion" February 1938. In 1942, the curriculum of standard undergraduate courses was expanded to include a summer semester "Accelerated Program" and evening adult classes to train defense specialists for the World War II War Effort.

In 1945, the DuBois Educational Foundation was incorporated to raise funds for campus growth. Following World War II, an influx of GI Bill veterans increased the student body, and throughout the next decades several new buildings were constructed to accommodate the continued growth. In 1959, the Pennsylvania State University formally integrated its "Centers" as "Commonwealth Campuses" and the "DuBois Undergraduate Center" officially became the DuBois Campus. Penn State DuBois serves the higher educational needs of the relatively rural surrounding area, and is an important educational resource for the entire DuBois region, including Clearfield, Jefferson and Elk Counties.

Academics
Currently serving 600 students, Penn State DuBois offers 8 associate and 6 bachelor's degree programs which can be completed entirely on site. The first two years of an additional 160 majors can be started at DuBois, with students matriculating to the Penn State University Park Campus to complete their degrees. All Penn State academic programs, credits and degrees are accredited by the Middle States Commission on Higher Education.

Campus life

The university does not maintain any residence halls on the DuBois campus. Students from the area generally live at home and commute, or reside in apartments in the surrounding communities. The Lions' Den Cafe is open daily from 8 am to 4 pm for student use, and serves hot lunches daily, Monday-Friday when classes are in session. There are many co-curricular activity opportunities for students both on campus and in the community.

Athletics
Penn State–DuBois athletic teams participate as members of the United States Collegiate Athletic Association (USCAA). The Nittany Lions are a member of the Pennsylvania State University Athletic Conference (PSUAC). Men's sports include baseball, basketball, cross country and wrestling; while women's sports include basketball, cross country, softball and volleyball. Co-Ed Golf.

References

External links 
 
Official athletics website

Educational institutions established in 1935
Pennsylvania State University colleges
Universities and colleges in Clearfield County, Pennsylvania
USCAA member institutions
1935 establishments in Pennsylvania
DuBois